Bulgasari is a lost 1962 South Korean kaiju film directed and edited by Kim Myeong-je. Produced by Kwang Seong Films Co., Ltd., it was the first monster film to be made in South Korea, as well as the first Korean film to use special effects. The film stars Choi Moo-ryong as Nam Hyeong / Bulgasari alongside Um Aing-ran, Gang Mi-ae, Kim Dong-won, and Lee Up-dong. In the film, a skilled martial artist is resurrected as an iron-eating monster in order to exact revenge on those who murdered him.

Bulgasari was reported to have begun production on November 26, 1961. It was inspired by the legendary Korean monster of the same name and heavily influenced by Godzilla. Principal photography began on February 28, 1962, and wrapped on March 24.

Bulgasari premiered at the Myungbo Theater in Seoul on December 1, 1962. The film received negative reviews from critics, especially because of its unconvincing effects, direction, and acting. Believed to have disappeared shortly after its release, the film is considered a significant feature in the history of South Korean cinema and one of the most sought-after lost kaiju films. Shin Sang-ok directed a remake of the film in 1985.

Plot
As Bulgasari is considered a lost film, this synopsis is derived from the review featured in the December 7, 1962 issue of The Chosun Ilbo and a summary at the Korean Movie Database.

In feudal Korea, during the late Goryeo Dynasty, an experienced martial artist named Nam Hyeong is slaughtered by traitors. His hatred makes him resurrected as the iron-eating monster, known as Bulgasari, to seek revenge.

Cast

 Choi Moo-ryong as Nam Hyeong / Bulgasari
 Um Aing-ran as Nam Lee
 Gang Mi-ae as Eunjeon Lee
 Kim Dong-won as the Castellan
 Lee Up-dong as Seonhye
 Jo Hang as the division director
 Choe Seong-ho as Do-Cheol
 Ji Bang-yeol as the ambassador of Dohwa
 Park Sun-bong as a gatekeeper
 No Gang as a gatekeeper
 Park Il as a strange man
 Park Kwang-jin as a strange man
 Park Gyeong-ju as Jeong Seung
 Sin Dong-hun
 Jeon Ye-chool
 Gang Cheol

Cast taken from the Korean Movie Database.

Crew

 Kim Myeong-je – director, editor
 Gang Sin-tak – planner
 Yang Jeong-chun – lighting
 Won Je-rae – art director
 Lee Seung-tae – costume designer
 Lee Kyeong-sun – sound recording
 Kwon Jinkyu – miniature artist

Personnel taken from the Korean Movie Database.

Production

Development 
Bulgasari was reported to have begun production on November 26, 1961. The film was inspired by the legendary Korean monster of the same name and heavily influenced by Godzilla.

Filming
Principal photography began on February 28, 1962, and wrapped on March 24.

Special effects
Bulgasari was the first South Korean film to use special effects. Two noteworthy special effects sequences caught viewers' attention: a witchcraft performance by the "White Lady" and her ascension into heaven.

Release

Marketing
Bulgasari was promoted as Korea's first film to use special effects in its "40 year history".

Theatrical
Bulgasari premiered at the Myungbo Theater in Seoul on December 1, 1962. The Korean Movie Database indicates the Korean Film Archive owns a document printed on March 26, 1963, suggesting a print of the film was made for North Korean screenings, but it is unclear whether it was ever used.

Critical response 
Bulgasari was widely panned upon its release due to ineffective special effects and antiquated direction by Kim Myeong-je. At the time, historical films were the only spectacles worth watching, and this film was considered childish and trashy. A reviewer for The Chosun Ilbo felt its directing method was outdated, and stated Choi Moo-ryong and Um Aing-ran's acting was "not very good," adding: "it adds boredom to the chorus of breathing in every line through the first part." The reviewer also noted that they could see "the strings hanging from the dragon's head" in one scene.

Preservation

Screenplay 
While the film itself is considered lost, the original screenplay is preserved at the Korean Film Archive. However, the screenplay is not accessible by the public.

Remake

Kim Jong-il assigned South Korean filmmaker Shin Sang-ok to direct a remake of the film in 1985, titled Pulgasari.

Legacy
Bulgasari is currently one of the most sought-after lost films in the kaiju genre, along with Wasei Kingu Kongu, The Great Buddha Arrival, and The King Kong That Appeared in Edo. It was listed No. 4 on GameRant's "8 Lost Films That Need to be Found".

Notes

References

External links

 
 

1962 films
1962 horror films
1960s monster movies
1960s science fiction horror films
1960s supernatural horror films
South Korean black-and-white films
1962 independent films
1962 martial arts films
Kaiju films
Giant monster films
1960s Korean-language films
Lost Korean films
Films about giants
Films about murder
Films about reincarnation
Films based on Korean myths and legends
South Korean films about revenge
South Korean disaster films
South Korean fantasy films
South Korean fantasy drama films
South Korean historical drama films
South Korean horror films
South Korean horror drama films
South Korean science fiction horror films
South Korean supernatural horror films
Films set in the Goryeo Dynasty
Films set in Kaesong
1960s lost films